Hoërskool Monument (also known by the nickname Monnas) is a parallel medium (formerly purely Afrikaans medium) high school situated in Krugersdorp, Gauteng, South Africa.

The school is considered one of the top rugby schools in South Africa and consistently rank amongst the country's top 10 teams in the South African schools unofficial rugby rankings. The first team rugby squad is known as the WitBulle (which translates as the White Bulls in English). The cultural activities offered by the school include choir, debate, public speaking, Junior United Nations, Miss Monnas, orators, and revue. The school also offers sports facilities for the following sports: athletics, golf, hockey, cricket, boys and girls, cross country, netball, rugby, chess, swimming, tennis and jukskei.

Notable alumni include former president and Nobel Prize laureate F. W. de Klerk along with numerous current and former Springbok and International rugby players.

History 
Monument High School was established on 1 February 1921 as an Afrikaans medium secondary school. Current student enrollment is in excess of 2000 pupils.

Sports

Rugby

1st Team 

The 'WitBulle' was founded by GW.Jorgenson in 1980

 Winner of Administrator, Directors and Beeld trophy 9 times: (1953, 1979, 1980,1984, 2005, 2009, 2010, 2017 and 2018)
 Won National Media 24 competition in 2003
 Transvaal / Golden Lions 1st team Macro Schools Competition champs for 25 years
 Nupower/ Tuks University 1st team winners in 2009, 2010, 2016, 2017 and 2018

Notable alumni 
See also :Category:Alumni of Monument High School

Politics 
 F. W. de Klerk, former State President of South Africa and Nobel Prize winner, completed high school education at Monument High School.

Sports 
The following alumni from Monument High School have played for the South Africa national rugby union team:
 Christo Wagenaar (1977) 
 Brendan Venter (1994)
 Jaque Fourie (2003)
 Jorrie Muller (2003)
 Heinke van der Merwe (2007)
 Willem Alberts (2010)
 Jaco Taute (2013)
 Ruan Dreyer (2016)
 Julian Redelinghuys (2016)

The following alumni from Monument High School have played for other International rugby union teams:
 Gert Peens, a South Africa-born, former Monument High School student and is an Italian rugby union player capped in 2002.
 Quintin Geldenhuys, is a former Monument High School student and a South Africa-born Italian rugby union player capped in 2010.
Paul Willemse (France)
Jaco van der Walt (Edinburgh)

In addition to the school's international success, Monument High School is one of the top producers of professional rugby players in South Africa, alongside other elite rugby schools like Grey College, Paul Roos Gymnasium, Bishops College and Afrikaanse Hoër Seunskool

References 

High schools in South Africa
Bilingual schools in South Africa
Mogale City Local Municipality
Boarding schools in South Africa